Verdellino is a comune (municipality) in the Province of Bergamo in the Italian region of Lombardy, located about  northeast of Milan and about  southwest of Bergamo. The town is easily reachable by train, the station of Verdello-Dalmine is in fact located on Verdellino's soil and the stop is one of several on the railroad line that connects the two cities of Bergamo and Milan.

Verdellino borders the following municipalities: Boltiere, Ciserano, Levate, Osio Sotto, Verdello.

Demographic evolution

Transportation
 Verdello-Dalmine railway station

References